The dozen Ngbaka languages are a family of Ubangian languages spoken in the Central African Republic and neighboring areas. It includes Pygmy languages such as Baka and Gundi. The most populous Ngbaka languages are Mbaka in the western branch, spoken by a quarter million people, and Mayogo in the eastern branch, spoken by half that number.

Like the Mba languages, the Ngbaka languages are spoken across discontiguous areas scattered across various central African countries.

Languages
Glottolog 3.4, following Winkhart (2015), gives the structure of the Baka-Mundu family as follows:
 Eastern
 Mayogo–Bangba: Bangba, Mayogo
 Mündü
 Western
 Baka (Baka–Ganzi, Gundi, Limassa, Ngombe)
River Western
 Mbaka / Bwaka (Ngbaka Ma'bo, Gilima)
 Gbanzili (Gbanziri–Buraka)
 Monzombo (Monzombo, Kpala–Yango)

The varieties listed for each may not be mutually intelligible.

References

External links
 Ngbaka languages project at Ghent University

 
Ubangian languages